The Battle of Vejle was a battle of the Second Schleswig War that occurred on March 8, 1864, between the Austrian Empire and Denmark on the town of Vejle. The Austrian victory at the battle opened the way for the Evacuation of Fredericia and the Battle of Jasmund as well as solidifying Ludwig von Gablenz's military career.

The Battle

At 6 a.m. the Austrian II Corps, led by Ludwig von Gablenz, set off from Kolding for Vejle. He led the 1st Division with Gondrecourt and the 2nd Division with Erwin von Neipperg. Since the Danes had dammed up the water in the Kolding Au and the second division didn't reach Vejle during the day. At 11 o'clock the Danish were encountered and a cavalry battle ensued, with the Austrian  initially thrown back in a skirmish with Danish dragoons. At 1 p.m. the 1st Division reached the southern forests of Pedersholm, Sønderskoven, Mølholm, and rallied there. On the northern side of the town, the road to Horsens passed through a gorge bordered by hills on both sides. The 1st, 11th and 7th Infantry Regiments of the 4th Danish Division plus two batteries of field artillery were entrenched on the ridges. Since the stream was also dammed up, only a narrow line remained passable along the main road in the gorge, but it was completely covered by the artillery. Nevertheless, the attack was dared. The 1st Battalion of the 14th Infantry Regiment was now descending the opposite side of the forest hill from Petersholm. The Danish battery on the opposite ridge tried to prevent the advance with devastating shrapnel fire. Nevertheless, the battalion reached the city's barricades without any hesitation and a street battle ensued. At 4 p.m. the city was taken and the 2nd Battalion and the Jäger Battalion now reinforced the attackers, the infantry regiment "King of the Belgians" not in action.occupied the marketplace. Ludwig von Gablenz convinced himself of the success, but soon realized that the city could only be held in the long term if the northern hills of the city were also cleared of the enemy. When Gondrecourt's brigade immediately arrived, the attack on the dominant northern ranges began. Two Austrian 8-pounder batteries began firing at the enemy positions at 16:30. The 9th and 18th Jäger Battalions were ordered to advance north and occupy the enemy's right flank at Sophienlund. For reasons that are difficult to understand, the Danes had not occupied this section in particular. It was too late for them to try to catch up on what they had missed.

At 17:30, the attack on the entire front was ordered. The Danish then took advantage of their advantageous position as the slope offered them a clear field of fire and, secured in the firing lines, could place their rifles on the ramparts, which resulted in many losses for the Austrians however they kept rushing forward. As luck would have it, the exact formations as Battle of Sankelmark however, the fight wasn't so costly. The defeated Danes retreated towards Horsens but an energetic pursuit wasn't possible because the night had set in and the Austrian troops were exhausted. After some rest, they had set out at 3 o'clock that morning and put a long battle behind them with an assault on high-lying positions.

Aftermath
The battle was significant regardless of its size and scope as the town was situated on Vejle Fjord and was part of the Fredericia-Kolding-Vejle triangle, thus dividing the Danish force in two as one half consisting of five regiments now faced south-east to the fortress of Fredericia. The other half consisting of three regiments of infantry and three regiments of cavalry, were now scattered in Jutland. This paved the way for the Evacuation of Fredericia and, on the other front, for the Battle of Jasmund. In order to obtain certainty about this, Gablenz pressed into expeditions to Horsens, Skanderborg, Silkeborg and in the next few days from Vejle and Aarhus. There was no sign of the vanished enemy anywhere and it was finally learned with difficulty that the Danish general had divided his troops at Skanderborg. So he remained in Vejle as a base for further operations against the fortress.

References

Bibliography
 Frank Jung: 1864. Der Krieg um Schleswig-Holstein. Ellert & Richter Verlag für Schleswig-Holsteinischer Zeitungsverlag, Hamburg 2014 .
  Oliver Bruhns: Schleswiger Stadtgeschichten. In: Reimer Witt, Oliver Bruhns: 1200 Jahre Schleswig. hrsg. vom Lions-Club Schleswig, 2006.
Theodor Fontane: Der Schleswig-Holsteinsche Krieg im Jahre 1864, Berlin 1866

Battles involving Denmark
Battles involving Austria
Battles of the Second Schleswig War
Conflicts in 1864
1864 in Denmark
1864 in Germany
March 1864 events
Battle of